Serruria fucifolia, the northern spiderhead, is a flower-bearing shrub that belongs to the genus Serruria and forms part of the fynbos. The plant is native to the Western Cape, South Africa.

Description

It bears silver-pink flowers from July to October. Fires in the summer destroy the plant but the seeds survive. Two months after flowering, the fruit falls off and ants disperse the seeds. They store the seeds in their nests. The plant is bisexual. It is pollinated by insects.

Distribution and habitat
The plant occurs in the Sandveld to the Hopefield Plains, Gifberg to the Olifants River Mountains and Piketberg.

References

fucifolia
Endemic flora of South Africa
Flora of the Cape Provinces
Plants described in 1809